The Curtis Cross House is a historic residence in Salem, Oregon, United States. It was designed by architect Clarence L. Smith, and was listed on the National Register of Historic Places in 1981.

The house was one of Smith's first works in Salem and the client, Curtis Cross, apparently was not happy.  Cross brought the project to Portland, Oregon architect Jamieson Parker to complete it.

References

Houses on the National Register of Historic Places in Salem, Oregon
Houses completed in 1924
1924 establishments in Oregon